CASP may mean:

Critical Assessment of Protein Structure Prediction, a worldwide experiment for protein structure prediction taking place since 1994
Certified Aerospace Physiologist, abbreviated CAsP
California Association of School Psychologists
Advanced Security Practitioner certification from CompTIA